Uramya is a genus of flies in the family Tachinidae.

Species
Uramya acuminata (Wulp, 1890)
Uramya albosetulosa Fleming & Wood, 2017
Uramya aldrichi Reinhard, 1935
Uramya brasiliensis (Robineau-Desvoidy, 1830)
Uramya brevicauda Curran, 1934
Uramya caudata (Schiner, 1868)
Uramya constricta Fleming & Wood, 2017
Uramya contraria Fleming & Wood, 2017
Uramya fasciata (Macquart, 1848)
Uramya halisidotae (Townsend, 1916)
Uramya indita (Walker, 1861)
Uramya infracta Fleming & Wood, 2017
Uramya insolita Guimarães, 1980
Uramya lativittata Fleming & Wood, 2017
Uramya limacodis (Townsend, 1892)
Uramya longa (Walker, 1853)
Uramya lunula Fleming & Wood, 2017
Uramya nitens (Schiner, 1868)
Uramya nitida Fleming & Wood, 2017
Uramya octomaculata (Townsend, 1919
Uramya pannosa Fleming & Wood, 2017
Uramya penai Guimarães, 1980
Uramya penicillata Fleming & Wood, 2017
Uramya plaumanni Guimarães, 1980
Uramya pristis (Walker, 1849)
Uramya producta Robineau-Desvoidy, 1830
Uramya quadrimaculata (Macquart, 1846)
Uramya rubripes (Aldrich, 1921)
Uramya sermyla (Walker, 1849)
Uramya setiventris (Wulp, 1890)
Uramya sibinivora Guimarães, 1980
Uramya townsendi Guimarães, 1980
Uramya umbratilis (Reinhard, 1935)
Uramya venusta (Wulp, 1890)

References

Dexiinae
Tachinidae genera
Taxa named by Jean-Baptiste Robineau-Desvoidy
Diptera of North America
Diptera of South America